The women's 10 metre air rifle event at the 2020 Summer Olympics took place on 24 July 2021 at the Asaka Shooting Range.

Records
Prior to this competition, the existing world and Olympic records were as follows.

Schedule
All times are Japan Standard Time (UTC+9)

Results

Qualification

Final

References

Shooting at the 2020 Summer Olympics
2021 in women's shooting sports
Women's events at the 2020 Summer Olympics